The Yuma Territorial Prison is a former prison located in Yuma, Arizona, United States. Opened on July 1, 1876, and shut down on September 15, 1909. It is one of the Yuma Crossing and Associated Sites on the National Register of Historic Places in the Yuma Crossing National Heritage Area. The site is now operated as a  historical museum by Arizona State Parks as Yuma Territorial Prison State Historic Park.

History

Prison
Opened while Arizona was still a U.S. territory, the prison accepted its first inmate on July 1, 1876. For the next 33 years 3,069 prisoners, including 29 women, served sentences there for crimes ranging from murder to polygamy. The prison was under continuous construction with labor provided by the prisoners. In 1909, the last prisoner left the Territorial Prison for the newly constructed Arizona State Prison Complex located in Florence, Arizona. It was also the third historic park in Arizona. The state historic park also contains a graveyard where 104 of the prisoners are buried.

High school
Yuma Union High School occupied the buildings from 1910 to 1914. When the school's football team played against Phoenix and unexpectedly won, the Phoenix team called the Yuma team "criminals". Yuma High adopted the nickname with pride, sometimes shortened to the "Crims". The school's symbol is the face of a hardened criminal, and the student merchandise shop is called the Cell Block.

Notable inmates
 Burt Alvord – Cochise County lawman and train robber
 Bill Downing – Train robber
 William J. Flake – Mormon pioneer imprisoned for violating the Edmunds Act
 Pearl Hart – stagecoach robber
 "Buckskin Frank" Leslie – gunfighter and killer of Billy Claiborne
 Ricardo Flores Magón – Mexican revolutionary, founder of the Partido Liberal Mexicano
 Pete Spence – outlaw involved in the Earp-Clanton feud

In popular culture
(Listed chronologically)
The Yuma Territorial Prison has been featured in:
 "Three-Ten to Yuma", a 1953 western short story written by Elmore Leonard, and also in two film adaptations:
 3:10 to Yuma, the 1957 original (directed by Delmer Daves and starring Glenn Ford and Van Heflin), and the 2007 remake, also titled 3:10 to Yuma, directed by James Mangold and starring Russell Crowe and Christian Bale.
 26 Men, the 1957 episode "Incident at Yuma" of the syndicated western series of true stories of the Arizona Rangers, focuses on a prison break and the difficulty of gathering a posse faced by Captain Thomas H. Rynning, portrayed by Tristram Coffin.
 "Hell Hole Prison" season 12, episode 8 of the Travel Channel show Ghost Adventures was shot at the prison. focusing its allegedly history of hauntings.
 In November 2018 the YouTube web series Buzzfeed Unsolved featured the prison on their episode "The Terrors of Yuma Territorial Prison."
 The prison was one of the two featured stories on the 71st episode of the podcast And That's Why We Drink.
 Named one of the top haunted destinations in America by USA Today in October 2020.
Bonanza episode featuring Dean Jones as an inmate of Yuma Territorial Prison.

Gallery

See also

 Thomas H. Rynning – former warden of the prison
 Ben Daniels – former superintendent of the prison
 Clifton Cliff Jail – historic site in the Clifton Townsite Historic District of Clifton, Arizona
 Gleeson Jail – in Gleeson, Arizona
 Jose Maria Redondo – the "Father of the Yuma Territorial Prison"
 List of historic properties in Yuma, Arizona
 Johnny Behan Past warden

References

Further reading

External links
 Yuma Territorial Prison Museum and Park – Historic Yuma AZ
 Arizona State Parks: Yuma Territorial Prison State Historic Park website
 AZ Department of Corrections: Early History, with Yuma Territorial Prison – Arizona Department of Corrections
 
 Yuma Territorial Prison – ghosttowns.com

History of Yuma County, Arizona
Museums in Yuma County, Arizona
Prison museums in the United States
History museums in Arizona
State parks of Arizona
Government buildings completed in 1876
Defunct prisons in Arizona
Buildings and structures in Yuma, Arizona
American frontier

1875 establishments in Arizona Territory